The 1982–83 Allsvenskan was the 49th season of the top division of Swedish handball. 12 teams competed in the league. IK Heim won the regular season and also won the playoffs to claim their seventh Swedish title. Vikingarnas IF were relegated.

League table

Playoffs

Semifinals
Västra Frölunda–Ystads IF 21–22, 25–21, 18–15 (Västra Frölunda IF advance to the finals)
IK Heim–IFK Karlskrona 22–18, 22–24, 19–17 (IK Heim advance to the finals)

Finals
IK Heim–Västra Frölunda IF 23–18, 20–16 (IK Heim champions)

References 

Swedish handball competitions